Binde is a village in Burkina Faso. It is the capital of Binde Department in Zoundwéogo.

References

Zoundwéogo Province
Populated places in the Centre-Sud Region